The following lists events that happened during 1888 in Australia.

Incumbents

Premiers
Premier of New South Wales – Henry Parkes
Premier of Queensland – Samuel Griffith (until 13 June), then Thomas McIlwraith (until 30 November), then Boyd Dunlop Morehead
Premier of South Australia – Thomas Playford II
Premier of Tasmania – Philip Fysh
Premier of Victoria – Duncan Gillies

Governors
Governor of New South Wales – Lord Carrington
Governor of Queensland – Sir Anthony Musgrave (until 9 October)
Governor of South Australia – Sir William Robinson
Governor of Tasmania – Sir Robert Hamilton
Governor of Victoria – Lord Loch
Governor of Western Australia – Sir Frederick Broome

Events
 27 January – Centennial Park is opened in Sydney.
 30 January – The Presbyterian Church of New South Wales establishes its first school, the Presbyterian Ladies' College, Sydney.
 1 July – "The Dawn: A Journal for Australian Women" first published by Louisa Lawson, in Sydney.
 1 August – The Melbourne Centennial Exhibition is opened.
 4 October – Princes Bridge, Melbourne is opened.
 9 October – Launceston, Tasmania is proclaimed a city.
The Colonial Secretary orders Wright be dismissed from the Queensland Maritime Defence Force, and has him removed from the ship by Queensland Police.

Undated

 Excavation begins on the water supply tunnels beneath Fremantle Prison, in Western Australia.
 Australia’s 100th Birthday not there are colonies Australia is not a country until 1901

Arts and literature

 Angus & Robertson publish their first book, A Crown of Wattle, a collection of poetry by H. Peden Steel

Sport
 6 November – Mentor wins the Melbourne Cup.

Births
 12 January – Leslie Gordon Chandler, ornithologist (died 1980)
 29 June – Squizzy Taylor, Melbourne gangster (died 1927)
 18 September – Herb Gilbert, national rugby league team captain (died 1972)
 31 October – Hubert Wilkins, polar explorer (died 1958)
 14 December – Harold Hardwick, freestyle swimmer (died 1959)

Deaths
 21 February – William Weston (born 1804), Premier of Tasmania (1857)
 30 May – Louis Buvelot (born 1814), painter
 15 August – Robert Seddon (born 1860), British rugby union player
 9 October – Anthony Musgrave (born 1828), Governor of South Australia (1873–1877) and Queensland (1883–1888)
 28 October – William Bede Dalley, Australia's first member of the Privy Council.

References

 
Australia
Years of the 19th century in Australia